Pedneault is a surname. Notable people with the surname include:

Roch Pedneault (1927–2018), Canadian Roman Catholic bishop
Yvon Pedneault, Canadian sports journalist and broadcaster